Jalan Padang Temu (Malacca state route M100) is a major road in Malacca state, Malaysia

List of junctions

Roads in Malacca